The church of  Sant'Eufemia is Gothic-style, Roman Catholic church in  Verona, region of Veneto, Italy.

History
A church at the site was likely present by the 11th or 12th century, although the main layout we see today was completed only in the 14th century.  In the interior, altarpieces were completed by Brusasorci and Giovanni Domenico Cignaroli. In the 14th-century Spolverini chapel, there is a canvas and frescos by Giovanni Francesco Caroto. The gothic belltower contains six bells in F rung with the Veronese bellringing art.

Bibliography
G.Borelli, Chiese e monasteri di Verona (1980), Banca popolare di Verona, Verona.
 Scheda della chiesa su verona.com

Eufemia
Gothic architecture in Verona
Eufemia